Toroczkai is a Hungarian surname. Notable people with the surname include:

László Toroczkai (born 1978), Hungarian politician and journalist
Máté Toroczkai (1553–1616), Hungarian bishop

Hungarian-language surnames